The ARIA Singles Chart ranks the best-performing singles in Australia. Its data, published by the Australian Recording Industry Association, is based collectively on each single's weekly physical and digital sales. In 2013, seventeen singles claimed the top spot, including "Thrift Shop" by Macklemore & Ryan Lewis, which started its peak position in late 2012. Fifteen acts achieved their first number-one single in Australia, either as a lead or featured artist: Mary Lambert, Nate Ruess, Baauer, Ray Dalton, Passenger, Daft Punk, Pharrell Williams, Robin Thicke, T.I., Avicii, 2 Chainz, Redfoo, Dami Im, Taylor Henderson and John Legend. Im and Henderson were the only Australian artists to achieve a number-one single.

Macklemore and Ryan Lewis had three number-one singles during the year for "Thrift Shop", "Same Love" and "Can't Hold Us". Jason Derulo earned two number-one singles for "Talk Dirty" and "Trumpets". Pharrell Williams also earned two number-one singles during the year, as a featured artist on Daft Punk's "Get Lucky" and Robin Thicke's "Blurred Lines". Katy Perry's "Roar" was the longest-running number-one single of 2013, having topped the ARIA Singles Chart for nine weeks. "Blurred Lines" was the second longest-running number-one single, with eight consecutive weeks at the top. Passenger's "Let Her Go" stayed at number one for five consecutive weeks, while Avicii's "Wake Me Up!" topped the chart for six consecutive weeks.

Chart history

Number-one artists

See also
 2013 in music
 List of number-one albums of 2013 (Australia)
 List of top 25 singles for 2013 in Australia
 List of top 10 singles in 2013 (Australia)

References

Australia Singles
Number-one singles
2013